The Premio Elena e Sergio Cumani is a Group 3 flat horse race in Italy open to thoroughbred fillies and mares aged three years or older. It is run at Milan over a distance of 1,600 metres (about 1 mile), and it is scheduled to take place each year in September or October.

The event is named in memory of Sergio Cumani, a ten-time champion trainer in Italy, and his wife Elena. It was formerly known as the Premio Bagutta, and for several years it was called the Premio Bagutta Memorial Sergio Cumani before being renamed the Premio Sergio Cumani. Elena Cumani's name was added to the title from the 2015 running.

Records
Most successful horse since 1979:
 no horse has won this race more than once since 1979

Leading jockey since 1988 (2 wins):
 Richard Quinn – Buckwig (1988), Welsh Diva (2002)
 Stefano Landi – Senebrova (1995), Desert Quiet (2006)
 Mirco Demuro – Marbye (2003), Khor Sheed (2011)
 Cristian Demuro – Nova Hawk (2012), Silver Step (2016)

Leading trainer since 1989 (2 wins):
 John Dunlop – Alabaq (1999), Snow Goose (2004)

Winners since 1989

 The 2008 running was cancelled because of a strike.
 The 2021 races took place at Capannelle.

Earlier winners

 1979: Luisa Morales
 1980: La Vreeland
 1981: Holga
 1982: Dewanadance
 1983: Lina Cavalieri
 1984: Royal Lorna
 1985: English Spring
 1986: Saint Samba
 1987: Russian Lady
 1988: Buckwig

See also
 List of Italian flat horse races

References
 Racing Post:

 galopp-sieger.de – Premio Bagutta Memorial Sergio Cumani.
 horseracingintfed.com – International Federation of Horseracing Authorities – Premio Elena e Sergio Cumani (2016).
 pedigreequery.com – Premio Sergio Cumani – Milano San Siro.

Horse races in Italy
Mile category horse races for fillies and mares
Sport in Milan